Myklebustad or Myklebostad is a village in the municipality of Rana in Nordland county, Norway.  It is located along Norwegian County Road 17 on the southern bank of the Sjona fjord, just west of the villages of Mæla and Utskarpen. Sjona Church is located in the western part of Myklebustad, serving the western part of Rana municipality.

The district surrounding the inner part of the Sjona fjord originally belonged to the municipality of Nesna.  On 1 January 1964, this district (population: 543) was merged with the town of Mo i Rana, the municipality of Nord-Rana, and the northern part of Sør-Rana to create the new municipality of Rana.

References

Villages in Nordland
Rana, Norway